Srđan Stanić (born 7 June 1982) is a Serbian former professional footballer who played as a midfielder.

Club career
Stanić made his senior debut for Vrbas in the last round of the 1999–2000 season. He spent one more year at the club, before transferring to OFK Beograd in the summer of 2001. Two years later, Stanić was sold to Russian club Spartak Moscow. He, however, failed to make an impact in the Russian capital, eventually returning to his country in 2005.

After spending three seasons at Hajduk Kula, Stanić moved abroad for the second time and joined Hungarian club Diósgyőr in the summer of 2008. He remained in Hungary for the next three years, also playing for Kaposvár (2009–10) and Ferencváros (2010–11).

In the 2012 winter transfer window, Stanić made a return to Serbia and signed with Borac Čačak. He spent the whole year at the club, before switching to Sloga Kraljevo. In early 2014, Stanić joined Vrbas and played there until retiring in 2017.

International career
At international level, Stanić was capped three times for Serbia and Montenegro at under-21 level.

Notes

References

External links

 
 
 

Association football midfielders
Diósgyőri VTK players
Expatriate footballers in Hungary
Expatriate footballers in Russia
FC Spartak Moscow players
Ferencvárosi TC footballers
First League of Serbia and Montenegro players
FK Borac Čačak players
FK Hajduk Kula players
FK Sloga Kraljevo players
FK Vrbas players
Kaposvári Rákóczi FC players
Nemzeti Bajnokság I players
Nemzeti Bajnokság II players
OFK Beograd players
People from Vrbas, Serbia
Russian Premier League players
Serbia and Montenegro expatriate footballers
Serbia and Montenegro expatriate sportspeople in Russia
Serbia and Montenegro footballers
Serbia and Montenegro under-21 international footballers
Serbian expatriate footballers
Serbian expatriate sportspeople in Hungary
Serbian First League players
Serbian footballers
Serbian SuperLiga players
1982 births
Living people